Edson Chagas (born 1977) is an Angolan photographer. Trained as a photojournalist, his works explore cities and consumerism. In his "Found Not Taken" series, the artist resituates abandoned objects elsewhere within cities. Another series uses African masks as a trope for understanding consumerism in Luanda, his home city. Chagas represented Angola at the 2013 Venice Biennale, for which he won its Golden Lion for best national pavilion. He has also exhibited at the Museum of Modern Art and Brooklyn Museum.

Early life 

Edson Chagas was born in Luanda, Angola, in 1977. He has a degree in photojournalism from the London College of Communication and studied documentary photography at the University of Wales, Newport. As of 2015, he continues to live in Luanda and works as the image editor for Expansão, an Angolan newspaper.

Career 

Chagas represented Angola at the country's first Venice Biennale national pavilion in 2013. His exhibition placed on the floor giveaway, poster-sized photographs of discarded objects positioned in relation to weathered architecture in the Angolan capital, Luanda. These poster stacks were in "stark juxtaposition" with the opulent, Catholic decorations of the host, Palazzo Cini, which had been closed for the previous two decades. The New York Times called the pavilion a "breakout star" of the Biennale, and it won the biennial's top prize, the Golden Lion for best national pavilion. The jury praised his showing of the "irreconcilability and complexity of site". Frieze wrote that the pavilion showed a "relational attitude to space, ... responsive to context and not overly concerned with diplomacy and reifying otherness", as other African nation pavilions had been. Artsy Giles Peppiatt named the series as a highlight and recommended purchase at the 2014 1:54 contemporary African art fair.

The photographs on display came from Chagas's larger series, "Found Not Taken", which included conceptually similar photographs from citiesin addition to Luandawhere the photographer had spent time: London and Newport, Wales. The curators had asked Chagas to only display the photographs from Luanda for the Biennale, which he found acceptable since it didn't take the series out of context. He found that the cities, which were each preparing to host major events, demonstrated a "sense of renewal" in its culture. Coming from Luanda, where everything was reused, Chagas noted how consumer habits have evolved over time. He photographed each object in spaces where it interacted with its environment. Some objects were shot in nearly the same space as they were found, while others had to be moved. Through this method, Chagas felt that he learned the city's rhythm. He has said that he plans to continue the series.

Chagas showed two different series in 2014. His works at the 1:54 art fair included large-format portraits that used African masks as a trope to comment on African identity. His "Oikonomo" series of self-portraits with shopping bags over his head were intended to hide his identity behind symbols of globalized capitalism and secondhand consumerism in Luandasecondhand goods permeate African consumer culture. Some of the bags include imagery such as a "World of Hope" slogan and a map of the Caribbean islands. This series, originally from 2011, was later shown at the Brooklyn Museum's 2016 "Disguise: Masks and Global African Art" exhibition. Hyperallergic highlighted the performativity in the artist wearing a Barack Obama bag over his head as kitschy, funny, and like another persona. Later in 2014, at Paris Photo, Chagas showed a portrait photograph series, "Tipo Passe", depicting models dressed in contemporary attire and wearing traditional, pre-colonial African masks. The clothes came from street markets and import retailers, while the masks came from a private collection. Hyperallergic described one such image, with its carved wood mask and plaid madras shirt a "delightfully incongruous combination". The prints were made in editions of seven.

In 2015, Chagas was chosen for the Museum of Modern Art's "Ocean of Images: New Photography 2015" contemporary photography exhibition. His selectionsfrom prior series "Found Not Taken", "Tino Passe", and "Oikonomo"focused on themes of cities and consumerism.

References

External links 

 
 Edson Chagas at Artsy

Angolan photographers
Living people
1977 births
People from Luanda
21st-century Angolan people
21st-century photographers